In Canada, the Principal Secretary is a senior aide, often the most senior political aide, to a head of government. Formerly, the position of Principal Secretary was the most senior one in the Canadian Prime Minister's Office (PMO). However, since 1987, it has been second to the Chief of Staff position.

The Leader of the Official Opposition and most Canadian provincial Premiers also have a principal secretary.

The role of the principal secretary may vary from administration to administration, depending on how the prime minister or provincial premier structures the workflow in his or her office; this has sometimes led to ambiguity in clearly defining the distinction between the roles of principal secretary and chief of staff to the general public.

List of Principal Secretaries to the Prime Minister
 Gerald Butts (2015–2019) 
 Ray Novak (2008–2013)
 Francis Fox (2004)
 Jean Riou (1993)  
 Michel Roy, Senior Advisor (1992–1993)
 Hugh Segal, Senior Advisor (1991–1992) 
 Tom Trbovich, Senior Policy Advisor (1990–1991)
 Bruce Phillips, Senior Advisor (1989–1990)
 Peter G. White (1988–1989)
 Bernard A. Roy (1984–1988)
 John Swift (1984)
 Tom Axworthy (1981–1984)
 James A. Coutts (1975–1979, 1980–1981)
 William Neville, Chief of Staff (1979–1980) 
 Jack Austin (1974-1975)
 Martin O'Connell (1973–1974)
 Marc Lalonde (1968–1972)
 Thomas Worrall Kent, Special Advisor (1967–1968)
 Gordon Robertson, Special Advisor (1967–1968)
 John Hodgson (1966–1967)
 Thomas Worrall Kent, Policy Secretary to the Prime Minister (1964–1965)
 Coordinator of Programming (1963–1964)
 Bert Richardson, Special Assistant (1962–1963)
 John Fisher, Special Assistant (1961–1962)  
 Gowen Guest, Executive Assistant (1958–1961)  
 Derek Bedson, Head PM's office (1957–1958)  
 Dale Thomson (1952–1953)
 Pierre Asselin, Private secretary (1952–1958)  
 Jack W. Pickersgill, Special Assistant to Prime Minister (1945–1952)  
 Gideon Matte, Private secretary (1945–1948)  
 Walter J. Turnbull, Principal secretary (1940–1945)  
 Arnold Heeney (1938–1940)  
 E.A. Pickering, Assistant private secretary (1935–1938)  
 Howard R.L. Henry, Private secretary (1935)
 Andrew Dyas MacLean, Secretary (1931–1935)  
 Arthur Merriam, Private secretary (1930–1935)  
 Rod Finlayson, Principal senior secretary (1930–1935)  
 Harry Baldwin, Principal private secretary (1929–1930)  
 Norman Rogers, Assistant secretary (1929–1930)  
 Howard Measures, Personal secretary (1925–1930)  
 Ralph Campney, title unknown (1924–1926)  
 Leslie Clare Moyer, Private secretary (1922–1927)  
 Fred A. McGregor, Secretary (1921–1922)  
 Laurent Beaudry, Private secretary (1921–1922)  
 Loring Christie, Principal Advisor (External Affairs) (1920–1921)  
 Arthur Merriam, Principal secretary (1920–1921)  
 Loring Christie, Principal Advisor (External Affairs) (1914–1920)  
 Austin Ernest Blount, Private secretary (1911–1917)  
 Ernest Joseph Lemaire, Private secretary (1904–1912)  
 Austin Ernest Blount (1896)
 Douglas Stewart, Secretary (1892–1894)  
 Joseph Pope, Secretary (1892)
Private secretary (1882–1891)  
Under private secretary (1878–1882)
 Fred White, Private secretary (1878–1882)  
 William Buckingham, Secretary (1873–1878)  
 Hewitt Bernard, Private secretary (1867–1873)

See also
 Canadian Secretary to the Queen
 Secretary to the Governor General of Canada

References

External links
 Principal Secretaries to the Prime Minister – Parliament of Canada website 

Government of Canada
Political occupations